This is a list of crime films released in 1993.

References

1993